Fennis Wayne Faircloth, known as Wayne Faircloth (born March 10, 1953), is an insurance agent  from Dickinson, Texas, who served two terms as a Republican member of the Texas House of Representatives for District 23, which encompasses a portion of Galveston County. He was defeated in the GOP primary election held on March 6, 2018, by Mayes Middleton, who assumed the seat in January 2019.

Background

Political career

References

External links
 Campaign website
 State legislative page
 Wayne Faircloth at the Texas Tribune

1953 births
Living people
Sam Houston State University alumni
Insurance agents
People from Galveston, Texas
Texas city council members
Republican Party members of the Texas House of Representatives
21st-century American politicians
Educators from Texas